Bonicord is an unincorporated community in Dyer County, Tennessee, United States.

Economy
Bonicord is predominantly a small farming community centered around a volunteer fire department and hosts several small businesses.

Volunteer Fire Department
Bonicord's volunteer fire department also functions as a voting station for local residents, as well as small community events and organizations.

Notes

Unincorporated communities in Dyer County, Tennessee
Unincorporated communities in Tennessee